Cerorhinca is a genus of auk containing the rhinoceros auklet and several fossil species.

Evolutionary history
The genus Cerorhinca evolved in the North Pacific during the Miocene. Fossils have been found as far south as Baja California. While previously only known from the Pacific region, an unnamed species has been discovered from the Pliocene of North Carolina, suggesting the genus had a much wider distribution in the past.

References

 
Bird genera
Bird genera with one living species
Taxa named by Charles Lucien Bonaparte
Alcidae